The Fraternitas Scintilla Legis, otherwise known as Scintilla Legis, or simply FSL, is a law school-based fraternity in the Philippines. The name of the fraternity is derived from the Latin words scintilla which means spark, and legis which means law. It was founded in 1974 by seven students at the College of Law of Xavier University in Cagayan de Oro.   In 1980, a chapter was established in Silliman University and for many years, the two chapters co-existed.  In 1996, a group of FSL alumni from Silliman University established a third chapter in Western Mindanao State University. In 2005 a chapter was established in Liceo de Cagayan University and in 2007 another chapter also followed in Bukidnon State University.  At present, the fraternity is composed of five chapters, four in Mindanao and one in the Visayas.  They meet annually in a national convention.

Since its founding, members of the fraternity have gone through different areas in the practice of law and the three branches of the government, some becoming judges in the trial courts and the Court of Appeals of the Philippines. Among its notable members are Associate Justice Romulo Borja of the Court of Appeals,  former governor and congressman George Arnaiz of the Province of Negros Oriental, and Atty. Burt Estrada, the current National President of the Integrated Bar of the Philippines (IBP).

Chapters 
Xavier University (Mother Chapter)
Silliman University
Western Mindanao State University
Liceo de Cagayan University
Bukidnon State University

References

Student societies in the Philippines
Legal fraternities and sororities in the Philippines
Student organizations established in 1974
1974 establishments in the Philippines